Tomorrow's Hits is a June 1962 compilation album issued by Vee-Jay Records. Unlike most compilations, the album showcased not songs which had already been issued, but songs which had mainly yet to be issued. Alongside established artists, the album introduced some unknown artists: Rod Bernard, The Sheppards, Ray Whitley, Grover Mitchell, Norman Charles, and the Bill Allen Trio.

Track list
Side one:
"Walk On With The Duke" – Duke Of Earl
"Please Help" – The Dukays
"Come To Me" – The Sheppards
"Colinda" – Rod Bernard written by Hall-Way 1902
"Yessiree Yessiree" – Ray Whitley
"Bye, Bye Blues" – Bill Allen & Trio
Side two:
"You Won't Be Sorry" – Jerry Butler
"Fever" – Dee Clark
"Welcome Stranger" – Wade Flemons
"That's A Good Idea" – Grover Mitchell
"Dance On Little Girl" – Dee Clark
"Climb Every Mountain" – Norman Charles

References

1962 albums
Vee-Jay Records albums